France has used many military aircraft both in its air force, the Armée de l'Air, and other branches of its armed forces. Numerous aircraft were designed and built in France, but many aircraft from elsewhere, or part of joint ventures have been used as well. Lighter-than-air aircraft such as dirigibles and balloons found use starting in the 19th century used mainly for observation. The advent of World War I saw an explosion in the number France's aircraft, though development slowed after. While having many promising designs in development in the 1930s, government wrangling delayed development enough there was little available at the out break of World War II. The armistice in 1940 marked a low point, with Vichy France being allowed only reduced numbers and development halting. Many French aircraft were captured and used by Nazi Germany and its allies. Some aircraft that did escape served with the Allies or Free French forces, who also used many other types of allied aircraft. The cold-war saw the continued use of many other Western aircraft, mainly from the U.S., during a period of rebuilding of the aviation industry and under threat of war with the Soviet Union.  Many new types would come into service including the very successful Mirage series or the latest design, the Rafale.

To the end of World War I 

 Blériot XI
 Breguet 4
 Breguet 5
 Breguet 12
 Breguet 14 
 Caudron G.III
 Caudron G.IV
 Caudron G.VI
 Caudron R.IV
 Caudron R.XI
 Caudron R.XIV
 Dorand AR-series
 Hanriot HD.1 
 Hanriot HD.3
 Farman MF.7
 Farman MF.11
 Farman HF.20
 Farman F.40
 Farman F.50
 Letord Let.1
 Letord Let.7
 Letord Let.9
 Morane-Saulnier H
 Morane-Saulnier L
 Morane-Saulnier LA
 Morane-Saulnier N
 Morane-Saulnier P
 Morane-Saulnier T
 Morane-Saulnier AC
 Morane-Saulnier AI
 Nieuport VI
 Nieuport 10
 Nieuport 11 
 Nieuport 12
 Nieuport 14
 Nieuport 16
 Nieuport 17
 Nieuport 21
 Nieuport 23
 Nieuport 24
 Nieuport 24bis
 Nieuport 25
 Nieuport 27
 Nieuport 28
 REP Type N
 Salmson-Moineau S.M.1
 Salmson 2
 Salmson 4
 Sopwith 1½ Strutter
 SPAD S.A.2
 SPAD VII
 SPAD XI
 SPAD XII
 SPAD XIII
 SPAD XVI
 Voisin I
 Voisin III
 Voisin IV
 Voisin V
 Voisin VII
 Voisin VIII
 Voisin X

World War II 
See List of aircraft of the French Air Force during World War II

Rest of the 20th century

 Amiot AAC.1
 AAB.1
 Aérospatiale Dauphin
 Aérospatiale TB-30 Epsilon
 Aérospatiale Super Frelon
 Avro Anson
 Agusta-Bell 47
 Airbus A310
 Airbus A319
 Airbus A340
 Beechcraft T-34 Mentor
 Bell 47
 Bell P-39N/Q
 Bell P-63C
 Boeing C-135F
 Boeing E-3F Sentry
 Breguet 941S
 Breguet Alizé
 Breguet Atlantique
 CASA Aviocar
 CASA CN-235M
 Cessna 310
 Cessna 411
 Cessna F406 Caravan II
 Cessna O-1 Bird Dog
 Chance-Vought F-8 Crusader
 Dassault Étendard
 Dassault Super Étendard
 Dassault Falcon 10
 Dassault Falcon 20
 Dassault Falcon 50
 Dassault Falcon 900
 Dassault Flamant
 Dassault Mirage 5
 Dassault Mirage III
 Dassault Mirage IV
 Dassault Mirage F1
 Dassault Mirage 2000
 Dassault Mystère
 Dassault Mystère IV
 Dassault Super Mystère
 Dassault Ouragan
 Dassault/Dornier Alpha Jet
 de Havilland Canada DHC-6 Twin Otter
 de Havilland Mosquito
  de Havilland Vampire FB.5
 Dewoitine D.520
 Douglas A-26 Invader
 Douglas C-47
 Douglas DC-6
 Douglas DC-8
 Douglas AD4 Skyraider
  Douglas SBD/A-24 Dauntless
 Embraer Xingu
 English Electric Canberra
 Eurocopter Cougar
 Eurocopter Panther
 Fouga Magister
 Fouga Zephyr
 Gloster Meteor NF.11/T.7
 Grumman E-2C Hawkeye
  Grumman F6F-5/F6F-5N Hellcat
 Grumman TBF Avenger
 Lockheed T-33
 Lockheed SP-2H Neptune
 Lockheed C-130H Hercules
 Martin P5M Marlin
 Martin B-26 Marauder
 Max Holste Broussard
 Morane-Saulnier MS-760 "Paris"
 Mudry CAP 10
 Mudry CAP 20
 Nord Noratlas
 Nord 1101
 Nord 260
 Nord 262
 Nord 3202
 Nord 3400
 North American Aviation F-86K
 North American Aviation F-100 Super Sabre
 Piper PA-18 Super Cub
 Piper PA-22 Tri-Pacer
 Piper PA-23 Aztec
 Piper PA-31 Navajo
 Republic Aviation P-47 Thunderbolt
  Republic F-84E/G Thunderjet
 Republic F-84F Thunderstreak
 SOCATA TBM-700
 SEPECAT Jaguar
 Sikorsky H-34
 SNCAC NC.900
 Sud Alouette
 SNCASE Mistral
 Sud Aviation Caravelle
 Sud Gazelle
 Sud Puma
 Sud Aviation Vautour
 Sud-Ouest Bretagne
 Supermarine Spitfire
 Transall C.160
 Vought F4U Corsair
 Westland Lynx
 Yakovlev Yak-3

21st century
Aircraft either introduced after 2000 or in service as of 2000.

Fixed-wing

Propeller

Bréguet 1050 Alizé
Bréguet 1150 Atlantic
CASA C-212 Aviocar
CASA/IPTN CN-235
Cessna 310
Cessna 411
Reims-Cessna F406 Caravan II
Cirrus SR20
Embraer EMB 121 Xingu
Embraer EMB 312 Tucano (withdrawn 2009)
Grob G 120
Northrop Grumman E-2 Hawkeye
Lockheed C-130 Hercules
Mudry CAP 10
Pilatus PC-7
Pilatus PC-21 (2017)
SOCATA TBM
Socata TB 30 Epsilon
Transall C-160

Jet

Airbus A310
Airbus A319
Airbus A340
Boeing KC-135 Stratotanker
Boeing E-3 Sentry
Dassault Falcon 10
Dassault Falcon 20
Dassault Falcon 50
Dassault Falcon 900
Dassault Mirage IV
Dassault Mirage 5
Dassault Mirage F1
Dassault Mirage 2000
Dassault Rafale
Dassault/Dornier Alpha Jet
SEPECAT Jaguar

Helicopters

Aérospatiale Dauphin
Aérospatiale Gazelle
Aérospatiale SA 330 Puma
Aérospatiale SA 321 Super Frelon
Eurocopter AS532 Cougar
Eurocopter AS565 Panther
Sikorsky H-34
Westland Lynx

Gallery of the progression of French fighters

Gallery of the progression of French naval fighters

References

French Air and Space Force

France Military Aircraft
French military-related lists